The 2019 Qatar Open was the second event of the 2019 ITTF World Tour. It took place from 28–31 March in Doha, Qatar.

Men's singles
The Men's singles was won by Chinese player Ma Long.With this victory he entered into the record books by equally 27 ITTF World Tour Titles achieved by Vladimir Samsonov.

Seeds

Draw

Top half

Bottom half

Finals

Women's singles

Seeds

Draw

Top half

Bottom half

Finals

Men's doubles

Seeds

Draw

Women's doubles

Seeds

Draw

Mixed doubles

Seeds

Draw

References

External links

Tournament page on ITTF website

Qatar Open
2019 in Qatari sport
Qatar Open
Qatar Open
Sports competitions in Doha
Qatar Open